Lawrence Michael Porzio (born August 20, 1972) is a former pitcher in Major League Baseball who played for the Colorado Rockies and Chicago White Sox in parts of three seasons spanning 1999–2003. He last pitched professionally in 2008 for the Bridgeport Bluefish of the independent Atlantic League.

External links

Pelota Binaria (Venezuelan Winter League)

1972 births
Living people
Baseball players from Connecticut
Birmingham Barons players
Bridgeport Bluefish players
Buffalo Bisons (minor league) players
Cardenales de Lara players
American expatriate baseball players in Venezuela
Carolina Mudcats players
Charlotte Knights players
Chicago White Sox players
Colorado Rockies players
Colorado Springs Sky Sox players
Criollos de Caguas players
Danville 97s players
Estrellas Orientales players
American expatriate baseball players in the Dominican Republic
Gulf Coast Cubs players
Lafayette Leopards players
Liga de Béisbol Profesional Roberto Clemente pitchers
Mahoning Valley Scrappers players
Major League Baseball pitchers
Mississippi Braves players
Mobile Baysharks players
Ogden Raptors players
Richmond Braves players
Salem Avalanche players
Sioux City Explorers players
Sportspeople from Waterbury, Connecticut
Tennessee Tomahawks players
Villanova Wildcats baseball players
Western Connecticut State Colonials baseball players